Châtillon–Montrouge is the southern terminus of Line 13 of the Paris Métro and the northern terminus of Tram 6 to Viroflay-Rive-Droite. Also, in 2025, Paris Metro Line 15 of Grand Paris Express will stop here. An elevated station located on the border between the communes of Châtillon and Montrouge in Hauts-de-Seine, it opened on 9 November 1976 as part of the extension of Line 13 from Porte de Vanves.

Reversal at the station have been carried out using automatic train operation since June 2008. Platform screen doors were installed to protect passengers from falling under driverless trains. It was the first station on the metro to be so equipped, except on Line 14, which was built for automatic operations at its inception. A rubber-tired tramway (Line 6) from Châtillon to Vélizy-Villacoublay (later Viroflay) opened in 2014.

Station layout

Gallery

References

Roland, Gérard (2003). Stations de métro. D’Abbesses à Wagram. Éditions Bonneton.

Paris Métro stations in Châtillon, Hauts-de-Seine
Paris Métro stations in Montrouge
Railway stations in France opened in 1976
Articles containing video clips